Main page: List of Canadian plants by family

Families:
A | B | C | D | E | F | G | H | I J K | L | M | N | O | P Q | R | S | T | U V W | X Y Z

Elaeagnaceae 

 Elaeagnus commutata — American silverberry
 Shepherdia argentea — silver buffaloberry
 Shepherdia canadensis — Canada buffaloberry

Elatinaceae 

 Elatine americana — American waterwort
 Elatine minima — small waterwort
 Elatine rubella — southwestern waterwort
 Elatine triandra — longstem waterwort

Empetraceae 

 Corema conradii — broom crowberry
 Empetrum eamesii — rock crowberry
 Empetrum nigrum — black crowberry

Encalyptaceae 

 Bryobrittonia longipes
 Encalypta affinis
 Encalypta alpina
 Encalypta brevicolla
 Encalypta brevipes
 Encalypta ciliata
 Encalypta intermedia
 Encalypta longicolla
 Encalypta mutica
 Encalypta procera — extinguisher moss
 Encalypta rhaptocarpa — extinguisher moss
 Encalypta spathulata
 Encalypta vulgaris

Entodontaceae 

 Entodon brevisetus
 Entodon cladorrhizans
 Entodon concinnus — lime entodon
 Entodon schleicheri
 Entodon seductrix
 Pleurozium schreberi — feathermoss

Ephemeraceae 

 Ephemerum cohaerens — emerald dewdrops
 Ephemerum crassinervium — emerald dewdrops
 Ephemerum serratum
 Ephemerum spinulosum — emerald dewdrops
 Micromitrium austinii

Equisetaceae 

 Equisetum arvense — field horsetail
 Equisetum fluviatile — water horsetail
 Equisetum hyemale — rough horsetail
 Equisetum laevigatum — smooth scouring-rush
 Equisetum palustre — marsh horsetail
 Equisetum pratense — meadow horsetail
 Equisetum scirpoides — dwarf scouring-rush
 Equisetum sylvaticum — woodland horsetail
 Equisetum telmateia — giant horsetail
 Equisetum variegatum — variegated horsetail
 Equisetum x ferrissii
 Equisetum x litorale
 Equisetum x mackaii
 Equisetum x nelsonii

Ericaceae 

 Andromeda polifolia — bog rosemary
 Arbutus menziesii — Pacific madrone
 Arctostaphylos alpina — alpine manzanita
 Arctostaphylos columbiana — bristly manzanita
 Arctostaphylos rubra — red manzanita
 Arctostaphylos uva-ursi — bearberry
 Arctostaphylos x media
 Arctostaphylos x victorinii — Victorin's bearberry
 Cassiope lycopodioides — clubmoss bell-heather
 Cassiope mertensiana — western bell-heather
 Cassiope tetragona — arctic bell-heather
 Chamaedaphne calyculata — leatherleaf
 Elliottia pyroliflorus — copper-flower
 Epigaea repens — trailing arbutus
 Gaultheria hispidula — creeping snowberry
 Gaultheria humifusa — alpine spicy wintergreen
 Gaultheria ovatifolia — slender wintergreen
 Gaultheria procumbens — teaberry
 Gaultheria shallon — salal
 Gaylussacia baccata — black huckleberry
 Gaylussacia dumosa — dwarf huckleberry
 Harrimanella hypnoides — moss bell-heather
 Harrimanella stelleriana — starry bell-heather
 Kalmia angustifolia — sheep laurel
 Kalmia microphylla — alpine bog laurel
 Kalmia polifolia — pale laurel
 Ledum glandulosum — glandular Labrador-tea
 Ledum groenlandicum — common Labrador-tea
 Ledum palustre — marsh Labrador-tea
 Ledum x columbianum — Columbian Labrador-tea
 Loiseleuria procumbens — alpine-azalea
 Menziesia ferruginea — mock-azalea
 Phyllodoce caerulea — blue mountain-heath
 Phyllodoce empetriformis — pink mountain-heath
 Phyllodoce glanduliflora — yellow mountain-heath
 Phyllodoce x intermedia — hybrid mountain-heath
 Rhododendron albiflorum — white-flowered rhododendron
 Rhododendron canadense — rhodora
 Rhododendron lapponicum — Lapland azalea
 Rhododendron macrophyllum — Pacific rhododendron
 Vaccinium angustifolium — late lowbush blueberry
 Vaccinium boreale — northern blueberry
 Vaccinium caespitosum — dwarf huckleberry
 Vaccinium corymbosum — highbush blueberry
 Vaccinium deliciosum — Rainier blueberry
 Vaccinium fuscatum — black highbush blueberry
 Vaccinium macrocarpon — large cranberry
 Vaccinium membranaceum — square-twigged huckleberry
 Vaccinium myrtilloides — velvetleaf blueberry
 Vaccinium myrtillus — whortleberry 
 Vaccinium ovalifolium — oval-leaf huckleberry
 Vaccinium ovatum — evergreen blueberry
 Vaccinium oxycoccos — small cranberry
 Vaccinium pallidum — early lowbush blueberry
 Vaccinium parvifolium — red blueberry
 Vaccinium scoparium — grouseberry
 Vaccinium stamineum — squaw huckleberry
 Vaccinium uliginosum — alpine blueberry
 Vaccinium vitis-idaea — mountain cranberry
 Vaccinium x nubigenum

Eriocaulaceae 

 Eriocaulon aquaticum — seven-angle pipewort
 Eriocaulon parkeri — Parker's pipewort

Euphorbiaceae 

 Acalypha rhomboidea — common copperleaf
 Chamaesyce geyeri — Geyer's broomspurge
 Chamaesyce glyptosperma — corrugate-seed broomspurge
 Chamaesyce nutans — eyebane broomspurge
 Chamaesyce polygonifolia — seaside spurge
 Chamaesyce serpens — matted broomspurge
 Chamaesyce serpyllifolia — thymeleaf broomspurge
 Chamaesyce vermiculata — worm-seeded spurge
 Euphorbia commutata — wood spurge
 Euphorbia corollata — flowering spurge
 Euphorbia spathulata — reticulate-seeded spurge

Canada,family,E